Muzyka may refer to:

Aleksandr Muzyka (born 1969), former Russian football player
Alex Muzyka (1929–1993), Canadian football player
Daniel Muzyka, Professor of Management at The Sauder School of Business, University of British Columbia 
Kirill Muzyka (born 1990), Russian professional football player
Ray Muzyka CM is a Canadian investor, entrepreneur and physician

See also
Muszynka